The Chinese Taipei men's national under 20 ice hockey team is the national under-20 ice hockey team in the Republic of China (Taiwan). The team represents Chinese Taipei at the International Ice Hockey Federation's World Junior Hockey Championship Division III.

International competitions

World Junior Championships

  2010  – 39th place (5th in  Division III )

  2011  – 41st place (7th in  Division III)

  2017  – 41st place (7th in  Division III )

  2018  – 42nd place (8th in  Division III )

  2019  – 40th place (6th in  Division III )

  2020  – 41st place (7th in  Division III )

  2021  – Cancelled due to COVID-19 pandemic

  2022  – 35th place (1st in  Division III )

  2023  – 33rd (5th in  Division IIB )

Ice hockey in Taiwan
Junior national ice hockey teams
Ice hockey